Pratesh Shirodkar (born 19 February 1989), is an Indian footballer who plays as a midfielder for Real Kashmir in the I-League.

Career

Sporting Goa
After spending his youth career with SESA Football Academy in Goa Pratesh signed for Sporting Clube de Goa of the I-League on 29 June 2012. Pratesh scored his first goal for the club on 28 August 2012 against ONGC in the 2012 Durand Cup.

Mumbai City
In July 2015 Shirodkar was drafted to play for Mumbai City FC in the 2015 Indian Super League.

Goa
After playing the 2015 Indian Super League season with Mumbai City, Shirodkar signed with his home state side, Goa, for the 2016 season.

Career statistics

Club

Honours

Club 
FC Goa
Indian Super Cup: 2019

Real Kashmir
IFA Shield: 2020, 2021

References

Indian footballers
1989 births
Living people
People from North Goa district
Footballers from Goa
I-League players
Sporting Clube de Goa players
Mumbai City FC players
FC Goa players
Association football midfielders
Real Kashmir FC players